Camarena may refer to:

Places
Camarena, a municipality located in the province of Toledo, Castile-La Mancha, Spain
Camarena de la Sierra, a municipality located in the province of Teruel, Aragon, Spain

People
Alfredo Ríos Camarena (born 1935), Mexican politician 
Consuelo Camarena (born 1943), Mexican politician
Enrique Camarena Robles (born 1957), Mexican psychiatrist
Enrique Camarena (DEA agent) (1947–1985), Special Agent, United States Drug Enforcement Administration (DEA)
Felipe Arturo Camarena (born 1956), Mexican politician
Guillermo González Camarena (1917–1965), Mexican electrical engineer who was the inventor of a color-wheel type of color television
Héctor Michel Camarena (born 1948), Mexican politician
Javier Camarena (born 1976), Mexican operatic tenor
Jillian Camarena-Williams (born 1982), American track and field athlete in the shot put
Jorge González Camarena (1908–1980), Mexican painter, muralist and sculptor
Juan Carlos Martínez Camarena (born 1991), Mexican footballer 
Juan Manuel Silva Camarena (born 1945), Mexican philosopher, Cathedratic Professor and academic functionary
Kiki Camarena (1947–1985), an American undercover agent for the United States Drug Enforcement Administration (DEA) who was abducted on February 7, 1985, and then tortured and murdered, while on assignment in Mexico
Meghan Camarena (born 1987) known by her online pseudonym Strawburry17, an American YouTube personality and television host

See also
Chon (band), an American progressive rock and math rock band made up of Mario Camarena, Erick Hansel, Esiah Camarena and Nathan Camarena

Spanish-language surnames